Citizen is a 2001 Indian Tamil-language political action thriller film written and directed by Saravana Subbiah and produced by S. S. Chakravarthy. The film stars Ajith Kumar in dual roles with Meena, Vasundhara Das and Nagma playing the supporting roles. The film's score and soundtrack were composed by Deva, and cinematography was handled by Ravi K. Chandran. The film was released theatrically on 9 June 2001 and became a super hit at the box-office.

Plot

Abdullah runs a motorcycle workshop with a few workers. He also gives casual legal advice to the locals. A computer science student named Indhu develops a crush on him and tries to woo him, although Abdullah has nothing of it.

In a massive street protest by lawyers across the city, Abdullah, in altered appearance, kidnaps Judge Vedhachalam, after introducing himself as ‘Citizen’. Later on, Abdullah proceeds to kidnap Collector Santhanam by posing as freedom fighter Sundaramoorthy. In both kidnaps, Abdullah mentions ‘Attipatti’, which seemed to render his victims speechless.

With these two high-profile kidnappings, the case is handed over to CBI, led by Senior Officer Sarojini Harichandran. Sarojini finds out that both kidnap victims worked together in the Mayavaram division some years ago, and was involved in a riot that happened in Attipatti. However, a check with the Mayiladuthurai sub-collector's office and Nagapattinam collector's office found that there is no town or village in the area named Attipatti. She then visits the main collector's office in Tanjavur and is shocked to find out that the village Attipatti existed in records before 1973, but not in the years after that. She becomes certain that the kidnapper, too, has a link to Attipatti.

Meanwhile, Abdullah becomes irritated with Indhu, who keeps longing for his affection. He scolds her and says that she doesn't know who he really is and the pain he endures in his heart.

Through a piece of information given by the Tanjavur office, the CBI team track down a former employee of the local government, which Attipatti was under. He tells them to visit Lutheran Chapel's Father Louis, who knew every single person of Attipatti. In a visit to the Lutheran Chapel, Sarojini and her team meet Father Kuriakose who inform them that Father Louis had passed away 10 years ago, but left a box to be handed over to whichever government body that comes to the church and asks about Attipatti. After reading the letter in the box, Sarojini instructs digging near the coastal area where Attipatti once located. She and her team are horrified to find hundreds of dead bodies buried deep under. They are presumably the former inhabitants of Attipatti. Buried with them is also a tombstone bearing the names of all who perished. After a quick verification with the last census, they found out one name is missing in the tombstone, a five-year-old named Arivanandam. Father Kuriakose informs Sarojini, based on church records, a boy named Anthony was baptised on the same year the atrocity happened, and that he eventually went on to obtain Law degree. Sarojini concludes that Arivanandam and Anthony are the same person, and he is Citizen, and her further investigation leads her to Abdullah. With the CBI officers prepare to ambush Abdullah in a mosque, he manages to escape via a secret route. Sarojini discovers Citizen's secret operation room within the mosque. There she finds out Citizen's next target is DGP Devasagayam. However, at the same moment, Citizen had already kidnapped the DGP. The CBI officers receive information that Citizen is hiding in Tada forest and go after him. In the forest, Indhu comes to meet Abdullah and reveals she already knew he was Citizen some time ago and that she still likes him in spite of that. CBI officers arrive at the forest and, after some chase, finally manage to arrest the Citizen.

In the trial, a flashback scene appears where Citizen tells the court what happened in his village, Attipatti. It was a hamlet of some 700 inhabitants surrounded by the sea. Therefore, it is often flooded by the rise in water levels, causing deaths. The area's MLA had promised to build a wall in exchange for votes. However, it was never built. When the villagers, led by Citizen's father, Subramani, go to the collector's office to ask about its status, the collector turned them away, saying a wall cannot be built in that area as the number of people is too small. The villagers later found out that the Collector, together with the MLA, the DGP and the Judge, had taken for themselves some 150 million rupees allocated by the government to build the wall. After that, when the four of them visited Attipatti, the outraged villagers embarrassed them by forcing them to eat moldy rice and pouring water on them. In response, the four officials vowed to make Attipatti disappear from the map. One night, they arrived at Attipatti with some men, caught all the villagers, tied them on a boat, tortured them and pushed them to the sea, killing all except Arivanandam.

As the scene switches back to the trial, Citizen explains he didn't kidnap the MLA because he had already been punished after losing in the election. With the judge, DGP and collector in the witness stand, Citizen tells the court death penalty or life in prison is too soft a punishment for them. He says corruption exists because government officers want to provide a luxurious life for their family members. He suggests stripping the wealth and citizenship of the three and all their immediate and extended family members. The film ends with the court releasing Citizen on the grounds that he fought for the good of the country.

Cast

Production
Early indications suggested that the film directed by Saravana Subbiah was a remake of the 1973 English film The Day of the Jackal, but it proved to be untrue. Ajith Kumar put on weight for the film, which would feature him in nine roles, and he claimed that he was inspired by Kamal Haasan's award-winning performances. Jyothika was originally a part of the cast but opted out due to conflicting commitments. Subsequently, singer Vasundhara Das, who had earlier appeared in Hey Ram, was chosen to play the leading lady, while Nagma was selected to essay the role of a police officer. A special feature on the making of the film was broadcast by Sun TV in May 2001. Gemini Ganesan was also initially meant to play a role in the film, but his character was later altered in the script and replaced by Pandiyan.

After 2 months of pre-production, shooting started on 28 December 2000 with Ajith and Vasundhara Das, after the former completed the shooting for his previous action thriller film Dheena, which was also released in 2001 during the Thai Pongal festival, with Ravi K. Chandran as cinematographer who had replaced P. C. Sriram in the project. The location for the Athipatty scenes was an island situated on the outskirts of Chennai, and it took three hours for the team to travel from the city and then by boat to get there. A scene filmed at Rajaji Hall featured five thousand of Ajith's fans as extras. A song in the film was shot in Australia in March 2001, delaying the proposed release date of 1 May.

Release
Upon release Citizen  received positive reviews from critics and was successful and completed 100-day run at the box office, justifying a relatively large budget of 8 crore. The review from The Hindu labelled it as a "definite milestone in Ajit's acting career". The film was commercial success.

The film was later dubbed and released as Citizen in Telugu, to positive  reviews. The actor and director began to work on another project titled Itihasam, written by Sujatha and focusing on caste issues, but the production was shelved.

Soundtrack 

The music was composed by Deva. All lyrics were penned by Vairamuthu. The song "I Like You" is copied from "I Feel Lonely" by German singer Sasha, and parts of "Pookara Pookara" were copied from "Take a Chance on Me" by ABBA.

References

External links
 

2001 films
2000s Tamil-language films
Indian films about revenge
Mass murder in fiction
Indian courtroom films
Indian action thriller films
Films scored by Deva (composer)
Films about social issues in India
Indian nonlinear narrative films
Films shot in Australia
Central Bureau of Investigation in fiction
Indian Army in films
Films set in Tamil Nadu
2001 action thriller films
Films about the caste system in India